Nağdalı or Nagdali or Nagdaly or Nakhdalli or Nagadaly may refer to:
Nağdalı, Absheron, Azerbaijan
Nağdalı, Lachin, Azerbaijan